Zaren Kesh (also known as Zazen Kesh) is a village in Kandovan Rural District, Kandovan District, Meyaneh County, East Azerbaijan Province, Iran. At the 2006 census, its population was 318, in 69 families.

References 

Populated places in Meyaneh County